UOX may refer to:
Urate oxidase, a gene
IATA code for University-Oxford Airport
Uranium oxide (UOx)